Realitatea–Caţavencu was Romanian’s premium media organisation, spanning  television networks, radio stations, publishing, and new media. Its portfolio of over 20 titles encompassed some of the country’s most trusted and respected  brands, such as Realitatea TV - the number one news source of all Romanians, Cotidianul – the daily newspaper of the elite, Academia Catavencu – the most influential satire press brand in Romania, Radio Guerrilla - the premium radio for young urban professionals, The Money Channel - the first Romanian business news channel, Tabu - the most courageous magazine for women, 24-FUN - the best city guide in Romania. The companies were sold in 2011.

As of April 2008, Realitatea-Catavencu is the only integrated media group, organized along four major divisions (quality, business, lifestyle and new media) as well as two strategic structures: a content agency – NewsIn, and the digital signage networks - Monopoly Media and Zoom.

In October 2008, Realitatea-Catavencu initiated Code Green, thus becoming the first media group to get involved in environment related issues and policy.  Cod Verde brings together our journalists and all the Romanians that feel responsible for the environment, those who can, and are willing to take charge. The campaign also includes public actions of large scope which exceed the current journalistic concerns.

Operations

Television
 Realitatea TV
 The Money Channel
 Romantica (co-owned by Chello Zone)
 Telesport
 Premium movie channels: CineStar, ActionStar, ComedyStar
 Publika TV (Moldova).

Radio
 Radio Guerrilla
 Realitatea FM 
 Gold FM (former Radio Total)

News agency
 NewsIn

In-store advertising & Digital signage 
 Monopoly Media
 ZOOM

Publishing
 24 Fun
 Academia Caţavencu
 Aventuri la pescuit
 Bilanţ
 Bucătăria pentru toţi
 Business Standard
 Cotidianul
 Idei în Dialog
 Investiţii şi Profit
 IQads
 J'adore
 Le Monde Diplomatique (Romanian edition)
 Money Express
 Psihologia Azi
 Superbebe
 Tabu

References

Mass media in Romania
Television networks in Romania